Kacper Ławski (born 11 May 1985 in  Łódź), is a Polish rugby player, second or third line of the lock in the French club CS Vienne.

Kacper played at all age levels—cadet (U-16), juniors (U-18 World Cup participant in 2003, European champion 2003) and youth (U-20 European championship participant 2004). He is a Polish national player.

Ławski is also representative of the Polish rugby sevens.

References

1985 births
Living people
Sportspeople from Łódź
Polish rugby union players
Polish expatriate rugby union players
Expatriate rugby union players in France
Polish expatriate sportspeople in France
Rugby union locks